Mary De Morgan (24 February 1850 – 18 May 1907) was an English writer and the author of three volumes of fairytales: On a Pincushion (1877); The Necklace of Princess Fiorimonde (1880); and The Windfairies (1900). These volumes appeared together in the collection The Necklace of Princess Fiorimonde – The Complete Fairy Stories of Mary De Morgan, published by Victor Gollancz Ltd in 1963, with an introduction by Roger Lancelyn Green.

Though De Morgan is one of the lesser known authors of literary fairytales, her works, heavily influenced by Hans Christian Andersen, are remarkable in deviating from the fairytale norm – often not including a happy ending, or not having the protagonist gain wealth or power (rather procuring the wisdom of recognising the value of living without these things); and in the satirical element of political comment in her works. According to the Greenwood Encyclopedia of Folk Tales and Fairy Tales, the fairytales of Mary De Morgan played a "comprehensive and central role" in her era in the evolution of the literary fairytale.

Her story, The Toy Princess, was featured on the BBC children's TV show Jackanory in 1966, and the same story featured on Jackanory Playhouse in 1981.

Her brother, potter, tile designer and novelist William De Morgan, illustrated her first volume.

Biography 

Mary De Morgan, the youngest daughter of distinguished mathematician Augustus De Morgan, was born in 7 Camden Street, London, on 24 February 1850. In her youth, Mary earned herself a reputation for tactlessness, apparently at one point telling Henry Holiday, "All artists are fools! Look at yourself and Mr. Solomon!"

Mrs. Poynter, wife of the artist Edward Poynter, wrote in a letter to her sister Alice, "She chattered awfully, and Louie, she is only just fifteen. I believe a judicious course of snubbing would do her good!"

She also apparently said something to offend a young Bernard Shaw who, according to Lancelyn Green, "hated her exceedingly".

Following her father's death in 1871, she resided with her brother William in his Chelsea house until his marriage in 1887, after which she lived in lodgings, making a living as a typist.

Mostly during her time living with William, Mary told stories to her own nephews and nieces, as well as to the children of friends and family, many among them artists and writers of note. Jenny and May Morris, children of William Morris; a young Rudyard Kipling and his sister, as well as their cousins, the Burne-Joneses and the Mackails. Angela Thirkell, née Mackail, and her brother, Denis Mackail, both novelists, were treated to the stories of Mary De Morgan in their youth.

William Morris was fond of her stories, and when he was dying in 1896, Mary came to nurse him.

The Windfairies, published in 1900, was her last collection of fairytales.

De Morgan died of tuberculosis in Cairo, Egypt, in 1907. She had moved there for the sake of her health, and taken charge of a reform school for girls in Helwan (or Helouan).

Politics 

Mary De Morgan was a member of women's suffragist group the Women's Franchise League. These views are reflected in her fairytales, which often have strong female protagonists (often outwitting or rescuing men), and, in the case of The Toy Princess, have been interpreted as mocking society's expectations of women (though the fictitious kingdom of the story places the same expectations upon its men.)

Renowned socialist William Morris was a close family friend; indeed, Mary told some of her stories to his children, and it has been suggested that his politics influenced her writings: she ridicules mass-production in "Siegfried and Handa" and "The Bread of Discontent", both of which show beings of evil intent behind a community's turn from well-made, hand-crafted goods to poor-quality mass-produced goods, with disastrous consequences. This has been interpreted as a criticism of capitalism.

De Morgan's stories also often contain the theme of wealth and power being shown to be negative attributes – an attitude which resonates with her remark quoted in Roger Lancelyn Green's introduction to her work: "I am so thankful I have only a small income – it is so delightful planning things and deciding what one can afford. It would bore me to death to be rich!"

Fairytales

On a Pincushion 

In the collection On a Pincushion, the first three stories are held within a frame story in which a brooch, a shawl-pin and a pin on a pincushion are telling each other tales to pass the time. This anthropomorphism of inanimate objects has been likened to the technique used by Hans Christian Andersen in many of his tales.

The Story of Vain Lamorna; The Seeds of Love; The Story of the Opal; Siegfried and Handa; The Hair Tree; The Toy Princess; Through The Fire

The Necklace of Princess Fiorimonde 
The Necklace of Princess Fiorimonde; The Wanderings of Arasmon; The Heart of Princess Joan; The Pedlar's Pack; The Bread of Discontent; The Three Clever Kings; The Wise Princess

The Windfairies 
The Windfairies; Vain Kesta; The Pool and the Tree; Nanina's Sheep; The Gipsy's Cup; The Story of a Cat; Dumb Othmar; The Rain Maiden; The Ploughman and the Gnome

References

External links
 
 

1850 births
1907 deaths
English children's writers
English short story writers
Victorian women writers
Victorian writers
19th-century English writers
British women short story writers
19th-century British women writers
British women children's writers
19th-century British short story writers